Hungary competed at the 2016 Winter Youth Olympics in Lillehammer, Norway from 12 to 21 February 2016.

Medalists

Medalists in mixed NOCs events

Alpine skiing

Boys

Girls

Biathlon

Boys

Girls

Mixed

Cross-country skiing

Boys

Figure skating

Singles

Mixed NOC team trophy

Freestyle skiing

Ski cross

Ice hockey

Ski jumping

Short track speed skating

Boys

Girls

Mixed team relay

Qualification Legend: FA=Final A (medal); FB=Final B (non-medal); FC=Final C (non-medal); FD=Final D (non-medal); SA/B=Semifinals A/B; SC/D=Semifinals C/D; ADV=Advanced to Next Round; PEN=Penalized

Snowboarding

Snowboard cross

See also
Hungary at the 2016 Summer Olympics

References

2016 in Hungarian sport
Nations at the 2016 Winter Youth Olympics
Hungary at the Youth Olympics